The 2022 Internationaux de Tennis de Vendée was a professional tennis tournament played on hard courts. It was the ninth edition of the tournament which was part of the 2022 ATP Challenger Tour. It took place in Mouilleron-le-Captif, France between 3 and 9 October 2022.

Singles main-draw entrants

Seeds

 1 Rankings are as of 26 September 2022.

Other entrants
The following players received wildcards into the singles main draw:
  Arthur Fils
  Vasek Pospisil
  Clément Tabur

The following players received entry into the singles main draw as alternates:
  Arthur Cazaux
  Vitaliy Sachko

The following players received entry from the qualifying draw:
  Mathias Bourgue
  Jurgen Briand
  Alexis Gautier
  Jules Marie
  David Poljak
  Valentin Royer

The following player received entry as a lucky loser:
  Kenny de Schepper

Champions

Singles

  Jelle Sels def.  Vasek Pospisil 6–4, 6–3.

Doubles

  Sander Arends /  David Pel def.  Purav Raja /  Divij Sharan 6–7(1–7), 7–6(8–6), [10–6].

References

2022 ATP Challenger Tour
2022
2022 in French tennis
October 2022 sports events in France